Rădășeni is a commune located in Suceava County, Romania. It is composed of three villages: Lămășeni, Pocoleni,  and Rădășeni.

Natives
 Nicolae N. Beldiceanu

References

Communes in Suceava County
Localities in Western Moldavia